Crenshaw may refer to:

Places in the United States
Crenshaw, Los Angeles
Crenshaw High School
Crenshaw County, Alabama
Crenshaw, Mississippi
Crenshaw, Pennsylvania

Transportation
Crenshaw Boulevard
Crenshaw station (C Line, Los Angeles Metro)
Expo/Crenshaw station (E Line, Los Angeles Metro)
K Line (Los Angeles Metro), known during construction as the Crenshaw/LAX Line

Other uses
 Crenshaw (surname)
 Crenshaw Company, a blockade running company during the American Civil War
 Crenshaw House (disambiguation)
 A type of muskmelon
 Crenshaw Site, an agreed point of burial mounds in Arkansas
 Crenshaw (mixtape), a 2013 mixtape by rapper Nipsey Hussle